George Barnes (1849 – 25 January 1934) was a British sport shooter who competed at the 1908 Summer Olympics.

In the 1908 Olympics he won a bronze medal in the stationary target small-bore rifle event.

References

External links
profile

1849 births
1934 deaths
British male sport shooters
Olympic shooters of Great Britain
Shooters at the 1908 Summer Olympics
Olympic bronze medallists for Great Britain
Olympic medalists in shooting
Medalists at the 1908 Summer Olympics